Buonomo is an Italian surname. Notable people with the surname include:

Alfonso Buonomo (1829–1903), Italian composer
Antonio Buonomo (born 1932), Italian composer, solo percussionist, and music educator
Jeannette Ramos Buonomo
Joseph Buonomo (born 1943), American entrepreneur 

Italian-language surnames